Davide Lamesta (born 19 April 2000) is an Italian professional footballer who plays as a winger and second striker for  club Alessandria.

Club career
Lamesta, born in Venaria Reale, started his career as a young in local club ASD Venaria Reale. In 2018, he joined to Piacenza, and was promoted to the first team in 2017.

On 2 September 2019, he was loaned to Serie D club Casale.

He made his debut for Piacenza and Serie C on 27 September 2020 against Grosseto.

On 12 January 2023, Lamesta signed with Alessandria.

References

External links
 
 

2000 births
Living people
People from Venaria Reale
Footballers from Piedmont
Sportspeople from the Metropolitan City of Turin
Italian footballers
Association football wingers
Serie C players
Serie D players
Piacenza Calcio 1919 players
Casale F.B.C. players
U.S. Alessandria Calcio 1912 players